The Good Shepherd (also known as The Confessor in the United States) is a 2004 drama film directed by Lewin Webb, starring Christian Slater, Molly Parker and Stephen Rea. The film follows a straying Catholic priest's investigation of a troubled teen's mysterious death. It was released direct-to-video on March 21, 2006.

Plot
This religious-themed thriller follows Daniel Clemens (Christian Slater), a fallen priest turned public-relations representative for the Catholic Church, risking his life to prove the innocence of a fellow clergyman who has been accused of committing murder. With the help from a dedicated reporter (Molly Parker) and a truth-seeking church lawyer (Stephen Rea), they begin uncovering a scandal that tests their faith.

Cast

Filming
Filming took place in Hamilton, Ontario in 2004.

References

External links

2004 films
English-language Canadian films
2004 drama films
Films with screenplays by Brad Mirman
Canadian drama films
2000s English-language films
2000s Canadian films
English-language drama films